Korea Airports Corporation was established in 1980 in Seoul, South Korea to carry out construction, checks and balances, management and operation of airports and to manage air transportation efficiently. As an organization specializing in airport management, KAC manages and operates total of 14 airports in Korea including Gimpo, Gimhae, Jeju, Daegu, Muan, Cheongju, and Yangyang international airport. KAC also manages the Area Control Center, 10 VOR/TACs and Korea Civil Aviation Training Center.

Its headquarters are on the property of Gimpo International Airport in Gangseo-gu, Seoul.

Timeline 

 May 30, 1980 – Founded International Airport Authority
 July 1, 1980 – Acquired the right to operate Gimpo International Airport
 May 9, 1983 – Acquired the right to operate Gimhae International Airport
 June 1, 1984 – Opened Civil Aviation Training Center
 September 6, 1985 – Acquired the right to operate Jeju International Airport (Jeju Island)
 April 7, 1990 – Renamed as Korea International Airport Authority
 June 28, 1990 – Acquired the right to operate 9 domestic airports including Daegu Airport
 December 14, 1991 – Renamed as Korea Airports Authority
 December 13, 1994 – Opened Air Route Traffic Control Center
 January 15, 1997 – Acquired the right to operate Cheongju and Wonju Airports
 January 15, 1999 – Acquired the right to operate 8 VOR/TACs (including Yangyang VOR/TAC)
 March 2, 2002 – Renamed as Korea Airports Corporation (KAC)
 April 3, 2002 – Acquired the right to operate Yangyang International Airport
 November 30, 2003 – Began Gimpo-Haneda flight service
 August 30, 2004 – Acquired ISO 9001 Service Quality System Certificate
 December 21, 2005 – Opened Service Academy
 October 23, 2007 – Acquired the right to operate Muan International Airport
 October 28, 2007 – Began Gimpo-Hongqiao flight service
 March 28, 2008 – Expanded business scope into manufacturing and sale of R&D equipment and overseas airport business
 July 8, 2010 – Acquired the right to operate Uljin Civil Aviation Training Center
 March 18, 2014 – Expanded business scope to training aviation professionals
 November 22, 2014 – Added business sectors of aircraft handling and maintenance

References 

Government-owned companies of South Korea
Companies based in Seoul
Airport operators
Transport operators of South Korea
Transport companies established in 1980
South Korean companies established in 1980